Afrasiyab, Afrasiab, Afrosiyab, or Afrosiyob may refer to:

Places
Afrasiyab (Samarkand), an ancient site of Northern Samarkand (present day Uzbekistan)
Afrasiab Museum of Samarkand, a museum on the site
Afrasiab, Iran, a village in Kurdistan Province

People
Afrasiyab dynasty, an Iranian Shia dynasty of Tabaristan (present-day Mazandaran province, Iran) 1349–1504
Kiya Afrasiyab, founder and first ruler of the dynasty, reigned 1349–1359
Afrasiyab I of Basra, originator of the title The Prince of Basra in 1596
Afrasiyab Badalbeyli (1907–1976), Soviet Azerbaijani composer

Other uses
Afrasiab, a sorcerer and emperor in the Persian epic Shahnameh
Afrosiyob, the train service name of high-speed rail in Uzbekistan